The Battle of the Windward Passage was a small naval action between French and British fleets that occurred on 17 to 19 October 1760 during the Seven Years' War. The action took place in the Caribbean between Cap-François and Eastern Cuba and resulted in a British victory.

At dawn on 17 October 1760, Admiral Charles Holmes in the 50-gun Hampshire, Captain Coningsby Norbury, took , Samuel Uvedale, and the 20-gun , Frederick Lewis Maitland, to intercept a French convoy they had sighted in the Windward Passage. The convoy was escorted by the 32-frigates Sirène, Duc de Choiseul, Prince Edward, and Fleur de Lys, and the 20-gun corvette Valeur.

The British gave chase but light winds slowed hampered them so it was evening before the lead ship Boreas could engage Sirène. French fire disabled Boreas aloft with the result that Boreas could not engage Sirène again until the following afternoon. Boreas emerged victorious from the engagement, capturing Sirène, which suffered about 80 men killed and wounded, most of whom died later; Boreas lost only one man killed and one wounded.

The next day Lively, using her sweeps, caught up at daybreak with the rearmost French vessel, Valeur. She had a crew of 160 men under the command of a Captain Talbot. Lively overhauled her off the eastern tip of Cuba and pounded her into submission after an engagement of 90 minutes. Lively had two men killed but no wounded; Valeur had 38 killed and 25 wounded, including her captain, master, and boatswain.

At the same time Hampshire, off the coast of Sainte Domingue, chased the frigate Prince Edward on shore where the 180 crewmen under the command of Captain Dubois set fire to her, causing her to blow up. Duc de Choiseul, with 180 men under the command of Captain Bellevan, escaped into Port-de-Paix. Fleur de Lys, with 190 crewmen under the command of Captain Diguarty, was found in an unprotected bay to leeward on 19 October; her crew scuttled her to prevent capture by Hampshire. The British also captured three merchant frigates – two carried cargoes of sugar and indigo and had only been a day out of Cap-François.

See also
 Great Britain in the Seven Years' War

References 
Notes

Citations

Bibliography
 
 
 

Conflicts in 1760
1760 in Haiti
1760 in the Caribbean
1760 in Cuba
Naval battles of the Seven Years' War
Naval battles involving France
Naval battles involving Great Britain
History of Haiti
French colonization of the Americas